Kadavar is the debut studio album by German rock band Kadavar, released on 10 July 2012 by This Charming Man Records/Tee Pee Records. The album consists of six songs, all composed by the band, including the lengthy "Purple Sage", plus bonus track "Living in Your Head".

Reception

Eduardo Rivadavia from AllMusic wrote a predominantly positive review of the album, describing the band as a "stubborn trio who refuse to let go of their 70s proto-metal dreams".

Track listing
All songs written and composed by Kadavar.

Bonus Track

Personnel
Kadavar
Christoph "Lupus" Lindemann – vocals, guitar, layout
Philipp "Mammut" Lippitz – bass
Christoph "Tiger" Bartelt – drums, production, mixing, mastering

Additional personnel
 Shazzula – theremin on "Purple Sage"
 Joe Dilworth – front cover photography
 Florian Penke – back cover photography

References

External links

2012 debut albums
Kadavar albums